Runni Saidpur is a town and a block located in Sitamarhi district, Bihar, India.  It is situated on the southern bank of the Lakhandei River. National Highway 77 passes through Runni Saidpur.

Geography
The village  is situated between Lakhandei river in the north and the Bagmati river to the south. This area has been hit by flood many times, though the land is very fertile. It is mostly gangetic plain with alluvial soil. The whole area lies to the south of the Someswar mountain range of the southern Himalayas in the north and the holy Ganges in the south. Summer is moderate and the winter is chilling cold.

The Runni Saidpur block lies in the southwest corner of the Sitamarhi district. It is bordered by the Belsand and Parsauni blocks to the northwest, Dumra to the north, Bajpatti to the northeast, and Nanpur to the east. On the south, it borders the Minapur and Aurai blocks of the Muzaffarpur district.

References

External links
http://offerings.nic.in/directory/adminreps/viewGPmapcvills.asp?gpcode=98664
http://jaibihar.com/sitamarhi-child-scientists-get-dubai-invite/2033/
http://wikimapia.org/4092088/Runi-Saidpur-District-Sitamarhi-Bihar-PIN-843328
http://sitamarhi.bih.nic.in/

Cities and towns in Sitamarhi district